Scelloides is a genus of flies in the family Dolichopodidae, found in New Zealand. The genus was originally named by Octave Parent in 1933. However, as the genus was not designated a type species, this name was unavailable until 1989, when Daniel J. Bickel and C. E. Dyte designated Scelloides ornatipes as the type species.

Species
 Scelloides armatus Parent, 1933
 Scelloides brunneifrons Parent, 1933
 Scelloides conspicuus Parent, 1933
 Scelloides fulvifrons Parent, 1933
 Scelloides maculatus Parent, 1933
 Scelloides ornatipes Parent, 1933
 Scelloides parcespinosus Parent, 1933
 Scelloides parvus Parent, 1933
 Scelloides pollinosus Parent, 1933
 Scelloides raptorius Parent, 1933
 Scelloides spinosus Parent, 1933
 Scelloides vicinus Parent, 1933

References

Sympycninae
Dolichopodidae genera
Diptera of New Zealand
Endemic insects of New Zealand